Cserhátszentiván is a village and municipality in the comitat of Nógrád, Hungary.

References

Populated places in Nógrád County